Rayfiel is a surname. Notable people with the surname include:

 David Rayfiel (1923–2011), American screenwriter
 David Rayfiel House
 Leo F. Rayfiel (1888–1978), American politician and judge

See also
 Rayfield